Thomas Dunlop (7 May 1872 – after 1898) was a Scottish professional footballer born in Annbank, South Ayrshire, who played as a right half. He made 59 appearances and scored twice in the English Football League playing for Small Heath.

References
 
 

1872 births
Year of death missing
Footballers from South Ayrshire
Scottish footballers
Association football wing halves
Birmingham City F.C. players
Dundee Harp F.C. players
English Football League players
Annbank F.C. players